The Stewart SF01 was the car that the Stewart Formula One team competed with in the 1997 Formula One season, and the first car constructed by the team.

Launch and design 
The car was launched in December 1996.

The SF01 was the team's first F1 car, designed by Alan Jenkins for three-time Drivers' Champion Jackie Stewart and son Paul to enter the series after several years in lower formulae such as Formula Three. This was the first Formula One car since the McLaren M26 in 1979 to run on Texaco fuel.

Racing history 
In an era when many smaller teams such as Forti, Pacific and Simtek went bankrupt, and fellow debutants MasterCard Lola folded almost immediately, Stewart's competent first year after building a car from scratch proved to be a welcome boost for the sport.

Whilst the car was quite competitive enough to regularly score points, it was frequently prevented from doing so by appalling unreliability; the team were only classified eight times out of a possible 34. The main reason for this were difficulties with mating the Ford engine with the car's oil tank. However, Barrichello drove to a fine second place at Monaco, the highlight of a season in which he largely eclipsed Magnussen.

The team eventually finished ninth in the Constructors' Championship, with six points.

Complete Formula One results
(key) (results in bold indicate pole position)

References

AUTOCOURSE 1997-98, Henry, Alan (ed.), Hazleton Publishing Ltd. (1997) 

Stewart Formula One cars
1997 Formula One season cars
Texaco